PS Prince of Wales was a paddle steamer passenger vessel operated by the London and North Western Railway and the Lancashire and Yorkshire Railway from 1886 to 1896.

History

She was deployed on the Fleetwood to Belfast services. She was the last paddle steamer built by the railway companies for cross channel traffic.

In 1896 she was sold and moved to Spain.

References

1886 ships
Passenger ships of the United Kingdom
Steamships
Ships built in Barrow-in-Furness
Ships of the London and North Western Railway
Ships of the Lancashire and Yorkshire Railway
Paddle steamers of the United Kingdom